Cousin Bette is a 1998 British–American comedy-drama film starring Jessica Lange in the title role and is loosely based on the novel of the same name by the French author Honoré de Balzac.

Plot
The wealthy Hulot family gathers at the deathbed of their matron Adeline (Geraldine Chaplin). Adeline's husband, the Baron Hector Hulot (Hugh Laurie), has squandered their fortune with his long standing competition with the wealthy Crevel to have the most extravagant mistresses, and plunged them heavily into debt.

Adeline's Cousin Bette (Jessica Lange), a poor and aging spinster, has spent her life supporting Adeline and her family with little return, and promises the dying Adeline that she will watch over the family, especially Adeline's young, unmarried daughter, Hortense (Kelly Macdonald). Because they were poor as children, their family chose to sacrifice Bette and launch only Adeline into an advantageous marriage due to her greater beauty, a fact which has caused Bette much hardship and extreme resentment in life.

Believing the death of Adeline would result in reward at last, Bette is infuriated when what she believed to be a proposal of marriage and an offer of a true place in the family from Baron Hulot is, in fact, an offer of employment to work as their (unpaid) housekeeper.

Bette returns to her humble apartment and continues her meager living as the costume maker for a Burlesque theater, where she becomes friends with the headliner of the show: the famed courtesan (and Baron Hulot's mistress) Jenny Cadine (Elisabeth Shue), and saves the life of a young and handsome sculptor living in her building—the displaced and impoverished Count Wenceslas Steinbach (Aden Young). Bette dotes on Wenceslas, giving him money, attention, and guidance, which she carefully tabulates in a book of debts she expects him to repay. Under Bette's predatory control and strict work schedules, the lackadaisical young artist us forced to become more productive and successful. 

Finding joy in her handsome new companion, whom she views with maternal, romantic, and sexual possessiveness, Bette tells her niece, Hortense, of her "sweetheart," Wenceslas, and of her new happiness. The young and spoiled Hortense is parched from a steady stream of ugly, dull, (but wealthy,) suitors, including her father's rival, Creval, who makes her lewd offers of great sums to see her naked. Hortense is intrigued by the romanticism of her aunt's stories of the handsome artist who happens to be a lord and decides to hunt him down in secret and steal him for herself. Preferring youth, indulgence, and beauty to Cousin Bette's repugnant and gargoyle-like possessiveness, Wenceslas jumps at the chance offered by the pretty, young noblewoman: the pair rebelliously indulge in a dalliance behind Cousin Bette's back, before marrying in haste so Wenceslas can accept a prestigious art commission secured for him by Baron Hulot. If successful, this commission would guarantee Wenceslas' major debut.

Bette views the theft of Wenceslas, whom she saw as hers, as the final betrayal and vows revenge. Enlisting the aid of Jenny, Bette begins to manipulate the Hulot family into succumbing to their baser desires and court their own demises.

One after the other, they fall into ruin under a combination of their family's precarious finances and Bette's subtle manipulations. Wenceslas, overly distracted and indulged as a rich new husband, philosophizes about being an artist more than he ever actually works at being an artist. Frittering away his time and money, he fails to complete the art commission and faces demands for the full repayment of the commission fee after he presents a barely touched block of marble. Wenceslas has completely squandered the money and the deeply in debt Baron Hulot cannot cover it, either. Hortense tries to gain the repayment money by appealing to the perverted Creval and agreeing to his earlier offers of favors for money. Bette manages to intercept and steal these funds before they ever reach Hortense. 

Jenny Cadine works quickly: she first favors Creval, to drive up Hulot's competitive spending, push Hulot towards fighting a duel with Creval, and distract Hulot from paying any attention to the family's mounting problems. Victorin, the Baron's son, attempts to mitigate the damage of his father's extravagant lifestyle by borrowing huge sums from ruthless loan sharks recommended by Cousin Bette. Jenny then switches her attentions to Wenceslas, who longs for escapism from the problems of his own making. Jenny is presented to Wenceslas by Bette as a potential investor and patron, and the two begin a steamy affair, with Jenny becoming his muse, and Hortense's romantic fancies shattered by the reality of her choice in husband. 

Cousin Bette arranges for Hulot and Hortense to discover their respective lovers having an affair together in a dramatic fashion. Hulot suffers a debilitating stroke from the shock, and Hortense, who believes Wenceslas has stolen the money from Creval to give to Jenny, attempts to murder Jenny, only to accidentally kill her own husband instead. With no way to make good on his debts, Victorin flees for his life from loan sharks threatening to kill him, and Hortense is imprisoned for murder.

As fighting breaks out in Paris, and the crack of gunfire becomes heard in streets, the Hulot's bleak fate is revealed. With Wenceslas a dead, the Baron crippled, Hortense in prison and Victorin in hiding, the family is largely destroyed. 

Bette ends triumphant. She has moved her costume workshop into the main rooms of the mostly shuttered Hulot mansion, where she holds court between the paralyzed Baron Hulot and the Hulot family's infant heir, whom she will raise as her own to be a great artist who returns her love.

Cast
 Jessica Lange – Cousin Bette
 Elisabeth Shue – Jenny Cadine
 Kelly Macdonald – Hortense
 Aden Young – Wenceslas
 Hugh Laurie – Baron Hector Hulot
 Bob Hoskins – Cesar Crevel
 Geraldine Chaplin – Adeline Hulot
 Toby Jones – Gentleman in Café des Artistes
 Laura Fraser – Mariette
 Toby Stephens – Victorin Hulot

Reception
Cousin Bette received mixed reviews from critics and it holds a 41% rating on Rotten Tomatoes based on 22 reviews. Jessica Lange received strong praise for her performance. Stephen Holden of The New York Times referred to the film as "it feels as rushed, overstuffed and devoid of texture".

References

Further reading
 Tibbetts, John C., and James M. Welsh, eds. The Encyclopedia of Novels Into Film (2nd ed. 2005) pp 77–78.

External links
 
 

1998 films
Films based on French novels
Films based on works by Honoré de Balzac
Films set in France
Films set in the 1840s
Fox Searchlight Pictures films
Films scored by Simon Boswell
1990s historical films
British historical films
1998 directorial debut films
1990s British films